John Jones (1816 – May 27, 1879) was an American abolitionist, businessman, civil rights leader, and philanthropist.

Jones was born in North Carolina and later lived in Tennessee. Arriving in Chicago with three dollars in assets in 1845, Jones rose to become a leading African-American figure in the early history of Chicago. He led a campaign to end the Black Codes of Illinois and was the first African-American to win public office in the state. He was the first black man in the state of Illinois to serve on a grand jury in 1870, became a notary public in 1871 and the same year was elected to the Cook County Commission. He also became become one of Chicago's wealthiest men through his successful tailoring business.

Along with his wife, Mary Jones, he was a dedicated abolitionist and philanthropist, turning their home into a stop on the Underground Railroad. The Jones' household was a center of abolitionist activity in the pre-Civil War era; the couple helped hundreds of fugitives fleeing slavery. Jones died in 1879 of kidney failure.

Early life 

Jones was born in Green City, North Carolina, in 1816 to a free biracial mother and German-American father. For most of his early life, he was an indentured servant who trained as a tailor in Memphis, Tennessee. In 1841, Jones married Mary Jane Richardson (1819-1909), the daughter of Elijah Richardson, a free Negro blacksmith.

Jones had first met her in Tennessee and he moved to Alton, Illinois to woo her. Their daughter Lavinia was born in 1843. The couple, ever mindful that their status as free could be called into question, secured fresh copies of freedmen's papers before an Alton court on November 28, 1844. The young family moved to Chicago in March 1845, eight years after the city's incorporation. Committed abolitionists, they were drawn by Chicago's large anti-slavery movement. On the journey, they were suspected of being runaway slaves and detained, but were freed on the appeal of their stagecoach driver.

Arrival in Chicago 
The couple arrived in the city with only $3.50 (equivalent to approximately $ in ) to their name, pawning a watch to afford rent and the purchase of two stoves. A black grocer, O. G. Hanson, gave the Joneses $2 in credit (equivalent to approximately $ in ). John Jones's tailoring business succeeded and by 1850, they were able to afford their own home. Although both were illiterate when they arrived in the city, they quickly learned to read and write, viewing it as key to empowerment—John wrote that "reading makes a free man".

The 1851 Chicago Directory lists the Joneses tailoring shop and contains this advertisement for his services:

During his early years in Chicago, Jones became close with  abolitionists Lemuel Covell Paine (L.C.P) Freer and Dr. Charles V. Dyer. They were credited by Jones for teaching him to read and write along with the fundamentals of business and real estate. Beyond his tailoring business, Jones invested in land that would develop into the first working-class neighborhood for Chicago black families.

Activism in Chicago 

The Joneses became members of a small community of African-Americans in Chicago, comprising 140 people at the time of their arrival. The Joneses joined the Liberty Party and made their family home Chicago's second stop on the Underground Railroad.

While John's tailoring business prospered, Mary managed their home as a center of black activism, organizing resistance to the Black Codes and other restrictive laws like the Fugitive Slave Act. Their friends included prominent abolitionists such as Frederick Douglass, who introduced them to John Brown. Brown and his associates, described by Mary as "the roughest looking men I ever saw", stayed with the Joneses on their way east to their raid on Harpers Ferry. The Joneses were not militant, despite their anti-slavery views, and did not support Brown's plan for a violent slave uprising.

Jones played a key role in Chicago’s Underground Railroad and opened a "General Intelligence Office" at 88 Dearborn Street in 1854. This was the major communications hub for African-Americans, both free and escaped slaves, from 1854 until the end of the Civil War. In 1861, the Joneses helped found Olivet Baptist Church, which contained the first library open to black Chicagoans.

Illinois black codes 
As early as 1847, Jones made it his primary objective to repeal Illinois' racist black laws. Illinois's version of a Black law or "code", first adopted in 1819, controlled (and in a 1853 law in the lead-up to the Civil War, forbade completely) black immigration into Illinois, and prohibited blacks from serving on juries or in the Illinois state militia. Jones' first attempt at repeal was writing a series of columns in the Western Citizen in 1847. It was also during this year that he began to work closely with his friend Frederick Douglass. In December 1850, Jones circulated a petition—signed by black residents of the state—for Illinois legislators to repeal the Black Laws. In 1864, the Chicago Tribune published Jones’ pamphlet, “The Black Laws of Illinois and a Few Reasons Why They Should Be Repealed.” It was not until 1865 that Illinois repealed the state’s provision of its Black Laws.

Later life 

In 1871, Jones was elected as a Cook County Commissioner, the first African-American to be elected to public office in Illinois. The same year, the Great Chicago Fire destroyed both the Jones family home and their four-story tailoring business, together valued at $85,000 (equivalent to approximately $ in ). The family was able to rebuild, building a new house near Prairie Avenue. Jones's tailoring business was also restarted at a new location; he continued to work until retiring in 1873.

Jones died from Bright's disease on May 27, 1879; his wife, Mary, was the executor of his will and inherited his fortune, becoming independently wealthy. His estate was valued at over $70,000 (equivalent to approximately $ in ); he had been one of the city's richest men. John's tailoring business was taken over by Lloyd Garrison Wheeler, a family friend. Mary Jones remained prominent in Chicago until her death in 1909. The Joneses are buried side-by-side in Chicago's Graceland Cemetery.

Recognition 
In 2004, the City of Chicago designated the site of the John and Mary Jones House as a Chicago Landmark.

References 

African-American abolitionists
Underground Railroad people
Underground Railroad in Illinois
Activists for African-American civil rights
African-American people in Illinois politics
African-American history in Chicago
Members of the Cook County Board of Commissioners
African-American businesspeople
19th-century African-American people
19th-century American businesspeople
Businesspeople from Chicago
Philanthropists from Illinois
People from North Carolina
Burials at Graceland Cemetery (Chicago)
1879 deaths
1816 births